Samoa uses UTC+13:00 as standard time. It observed daylight saving time from 2010 to 2021, which it observed during summer in the Southern Hemisphere. In 2011, daylight saving time ended on Saturday, 2 April 2011, 04:00 local daylight time and started on Saturday, 24 September 2011, 03:00 local standard time. Because it is located near the equator, Samoa traditionally did not observe daylight saving time. The introduction of daylight saving time was initially planned for 2009 but was postponed for one year in the aftermath of the 2009 Samoa tsunami.

As it is located just west of the International Date Line, Samoa is among the first places on earth to see each new day, along with Tonga, Tokelau (during standard time), and parts of Kiribati.

IANA time zone database
The IANA time zone database in the file zone.tab contains one zone for Samoa, named "Pacific/Apia".

2011 time zone change
Until the end of 2011, Samoa lay east of the International Date Line, observing UTC−11:00 (UTC−10:00 during daylight saving time). This was in line with neighboring American Samoa, which continues to observe UTC−11:00 (Samoa Time Zone) year-round. At the end of Thursday, 29 December 2011, Samoa continued directly to Saturday, 31 December 2011, skipping the entire calendar day of Friday, 30 December 2011 and effectively re-drawing the International Date Line. Prime minister Tuilaepa Sailele Malielegaoi stated that the change was intended to improve business with New Zealand, Australia, China, and other places in Asia.

References